Marco Rossi (born 30 September 1987) is an Italian association footballer who plays as a defender.

Club career
In July 2009, Parma exchanged Rossi with Antonio Mirante of Sampdoria, signing a season-long loan. On 24 June 2011, he was signed by Cesena in a co-ownership deal for €2 million after he spent a year with Bari. After the deal, Alberto Galuppo returned to Parma in July 2011 for €1 million.

In June 2012 the co-ownership was renewed. However, due to Rossi's involvement in the 2011 Italian football scandal, Parma gave up the remaining 50% registration rights for free. Rossi was banned for one year and eight months, thus Cesena terminated his contract.

On 31 March 2014, Rossi was signed by Perugia. In January 2015, he was signed by Varese in a temporary deal.

On 9 August 2016, it was announced that Rossi signed for the A-League club Wellington Phoenix. After playing for the Phoenix for two seasons for 38 games including 37 starts, Rossi left the club at the end of his contract.

In July 2018, Rossi moved to Robur Siena in Serie C.

On 16 July 2019, he signed with Reggina.

ON 31 August 2021, he was transferred to Seregno.

References

External links
 Profile at aic.football.it 
 Profile on figc.it 

1987 births
Living people
Sportspeople from Parma
Italian footballers
Association football defenders
Serie A players
Serie B players
Serie C players
Parma Calcio 1913 players
Modena F.C. players
U.C. Sampdoria players
S.S.C. Bari players
A.C. Cesena players
A.C. Perugia Calcio players
S.S.D. Varese Calcio players
A.C.N. Siena 1904 players
Reggina 1914 players
U.S. 1913 Seregno Calcio players
A-League Men players
Wellington Phoenix FC players
Italian expatriate footballers
Italian expatriate sportspeople in New Zealand
Expatriate association footballers in New Zealand
Italy youth international footballers
Italy under-21 international footballers
Footballers from Emilia-Romagna